WWLY (100.1 FM, "Wild Willie 100.1"),  is a radio station airing a classic country format. Licensed to Panama City Beach, Florida, United States, the station serves the Panama City area. The station is currently owned by Magic Broadcasting II, and features programming from Westwood One.

History
WPCF-FM was founded by Charles K. and Carlie B. Winstanley. The Winstanleys had a history in radio, founding WQXY in Baton Rouge in 1966, selling it in 1970, and moving their headquarters to Florida. During the Winstanley's tenure in Florida, they had purchased Christian station WPCF and decided to construct an FM simulcast. The station was assigned the call letters WPCF-FM on December 3, 1987, and it began airing less than a week later.  (After the Winstanleys sold the WPCF cluster in the mid-1990s, they left Florida for Louisiana in the mid-1990s, and became the owners of WYLA and WYLK in New Orleans' Northshore area from 1996-1999. Charles also had ownership interest in KJIN and KCIL in Houma.)

On March 10, 2000, the station changed its call sign to WQJM, under the "Jammin' Hits 100.1" moniker. They dropped this format for variety hits in 2001, calling themselves "Wave 100.1", causing them to change their signs again accordingly on 2002-06-25 to WVVE.[2] This format transitioned to include some classic hits staples, as well. In 2010, the format was spun to female-oriented Hot AC, under the new name "V-100".

On April 15, 2014, at 10 AM, WVVE dropped its Hot AC format and began stunting with a loop of the song "Let's Groove" by Earth, Wind & Fire. The station and its website were promoting that on the 17th, at 10am, "Panama City will find its groove". The station flipped at that time to Rhythmic Oldies as Groove 100.1". The first song on Groove 100.1 was "Fantastic Voyage" by Lakeside. The new Facebook page for the station promotes Groove 100.1 as "Feel good old school from the 70s, 80s, and 90s".

On August 8, 2016, WVVE changed their format from rhythmic oldies to active rock, branded as "97X", as WYYX's 97.7 FM frequency went silent.

In November 2, 2016, WVVE changed their call letters to WYYX.

On March 17, 2017, WYYX dropped the "97X" active rock format (the WYYX calls and format moved back to 97.7 FM Bonifay) and began stunting with Christmas music as "100.1 Santa FM" under new WWLY calls.

As of 8am on March 23, 2017, this station is now playing classic country, under the "Wild Willie 100.1" branding.

The station has been programmed by Jason Taylor since January, 2022.

Former logos

References

External links

WLY
Radio stations established in 1989
1989 establishments in Florida
Classic country radio stations in the United States